Gerald Gazzard (15 March 1925 – 29 September 2006) was an English footballer who played for West Ham United and Brentford.

Gazzard was born in Cinderford, Gloucestershire and having previously played as an amateur for Penzance, and made 20 appearances for the County of Cornwall XI, Gazzard signed pro forms at West Ham United in May 1949. He made his debut on the first day of the 1949–50 season, against Luton Town, and played in a total of 37 games that season. He played in 41 games in 1950–51, one game short of being an ever-present.

Gazzard moved to Brentford in 1954, after sustaining a cartilage injury and losing his first team place to John Dick. He later returned to Penzance as an amateur.

His two sons, Paul and Roger, also played for Penzance, and grandson Carl is a former county cricketer for Somerset.

References

External links

Gerry Gazzard at westhamstats.info

1925 births
2006 deaths
People from Cinderford
Footballers from Cornwall
Sportspeople from Gloucestershire
English footballers
Association football inside forwards
Truro City F.C. players
Penzance A.F.C. players
West Ham United F.C. players
Brentford F.C. players
English Football League players